The 1890 Nova Scotia general election was held from 14 May to 21 May 1890 to elect members of the 30th House of Assembly of the Province of Nova Scotia, Canada. It was won by the Liberal party.

Results

Results by party

Retiring incumbents
Liberal
Joseph H. Cook, Queens
Jeffrey McColl, Pictou
John S. McNeill, Digby
Leander Rand, Kings
Henri M. Robicheau, Digby

Liberal-Conservative
Frank Andrews, Annapolis
William C. Bill, Kings
Charles H. Munro, Pictou

Nominated candidates
1890 Nova Scotia Provincial Election

Legend
bold denotes party leader
† denotes an incumbent who is not running for re-election or was defeated in nomination contest

Valley

|-
| rowspan="2"|Annapolis
||
|James Wilberforce Longley1,88427.33%	
|
|C. S. Harrington1,62223.53%	
|
|
||
|James Wilberforce Longley
|-
||
|Harris H. Chute1,84426.75%	
|
|B. Starratt1,54322.39%	
|
|
||
|Frank Andrews†
|-
| rowspan="4"|Digby
||
|Ambroise-Hilaire Comeau1,20726.57%	
|rowspan=2|
|rowspan=2|Robert G. Munroe70815.59%	
|rowspan=2|
|rowspan=2|
|rowspan=2 |
|rowspan=2|Henri M. Robicheau†
|-
|
|William German4379.62%
|-
||
|Eliakim Tupper1,17925.96%	
|rowspan=2|
|rowspan=2|Daniel LeBlanc66514.64%	
|rowspan=2|
|rowspan=2|
|rowspan=2 |
|rowspan=2|John S. McNeill†
|-
|
|Edward Hogan3467.63%
|-
| rowspan="2"|Hants
||
|Allen Haley1,66125.28%
|
|Adam McDougall1,66025.26%	
|
|
||
|Allen Haley
|-	
|
|Archibald Frame1,55223.62%	
||
|Thomas Barlow Smith1,69825.84%	
|
|
||
|Archibald Frame
|-
| rowspan="2"|Kings
||
|Alfred P. Welton1,57225.12%
|
|Thomas R. Harris1,54024.61%
|
|
||
|Leander Rand†
|-	
|
|J. E. Starr1,40522.45%	
||
|Barclay Webster1,74127.82%	
|
|
||
|William C. Bill†
|-
|}

South Shore

|-
| rowspan="2"|Lunenburg
||
|John Drew Sperry2,09126.12%	
|
|James A. McLean1,96024.48%	
|
|
||
|John Drew Sperry
|-
||
|Charles Edward Church2,03325.39%	
|
|Charles A. Smith1,92224.01%	
|
|
||
|Charles Edward Church
|-
| rowspan="2"|Queens
||
|Richard Hunt89728.12%	
|
|Leander Ford72222.63%	
|
|
||
|Joseph H. Cook†
|-
||
|Albert M. Hemeon88727.81%	
|
|C. A. Bowlley68421.44%	
|
|
||
|Albert M. Hemeon
|-
| rowspan="2"|Shelburne
||
|Thomas Johnston1,06125.85%	
|
|Alfred K. Smith95123.17%
|
|
||
|Thomas Johnston
|-
|
|William F. MacCoy1,04225.38%	
||
|Charles Cahan1,05125.60%	
|
|
||
|William F. MacCoy
|-
| rowspan="2"|Yarmouth
||
|William Law1,48731.48%	
|
|M. D'Entremont96220.37%	
|
|
||
|William Law
|-
||
|Albert Gayton1,47331.19%	
|
|Jacob Bingay80116.96%	
|
|
||
|Albert Gayton
|-
|}

Fundy-Northeast

|-
| rowspan="2"|Colchester
||
|Frederick Andrew Laurence1,90425.71%	
|
|Israel Longworth1,84224.87%	
|
|
||
|Frederick Andrew Laurence
|-
||
|George Clarke1,86825.22%	
|
|William Albert Patterson1,79324.21%	
|
|
||
|George Clarke
|-
| rowspan="2"|Cumberland	
|
|Thomas Reuben Black2,53724.58%
||
|George W. Forrest2,81827.30%	
|
|
||
|Thomas Reuben Black
|-	
|
|Richard L. Black2,25221.82%
||
|William Oxley2,71526.30%	
|
|
||
|Richard L. Black
|-
|}

Halifax

|-
| rowspan="3"|Halifax
||
|William Stevens Fielding5,03618.86%	
|
|H. McDonald Henry4,21915.80%	
|
|
||
|William Stevens Fielding
|-
||
|William Roche4,82818.08%	
|
|P. O'Mullin3,94614.77%	
|
|
||
|William Roche
|-
||
|Michael Joseph Power4,75217.79%	
|
|J. J. Stewart3,92814.71%	
|
|
||
|Michael Joseph Power
|-
|}

Central Nova

|-
| rowspan="2"|Antigonish
||
|Angus McGillivray1,36230.68%	
|
|J.J. Cameron1,00322.60%	
|
|
||
|Angus McGillivray
|-
||
|Colin Francis McIsaac1,27428.70%	
|
|Archibald McPhee80018.02%	
|
|
||
|Colin Francis McIsaac
|-
| rowspan="2"|Guysborough	
|
|A. J. O. Maguire66318.98%
||
|Alexander F. Cameron83123.78%	
|
|Otto Schwartz Weeks (Independent Liberal)53815.40%
||
|Otto Schwartz Weeks
|-	
|
|James A. Fraser70720.23%
||
|Hamilton Morrow75521.61%	
|
|
||
|James A. Fraser
|-
| rowspan="3"|Pictou
|
|John Yorston2,72816.05%	
||
|William Cameron2,89717.05%	
|
|Robert Drummond2,76416.27%
||
|William Cameron
|-	
||
|James Drummond McGregor2,88516.98%
|
|Charles Elliott Tanner2,83516.68%
|
|
||
|Jeffrey McColl†
|-	
|
|
||
|Alexander Grant2,88316.97%
|
|
||
|Charles H. Munro†
|-
|}

Cape Breton

|-
| rowspan="2"|Cape Breton
||
|Angus J. MacDonald2,68128.23%	
|
|Colin Chisholm2,09722.08%
|
|
||
|Colin Chisholm
|-
||
|Joseph McPherson2,57927.15%	
|
|William MacKay2,14122.54%	
|
|
||
|William MacKay
|-
| rowspan="2"|Inverness
||
|Daniel McNeil1,90827.76%	
|
|John McKeen1,60223.31%	
|
|
||
|Daniel McNeil
|-
||
|John McKinnon1,87427.26%	
|
|Angus MacLennan1,49021.68%	
|
|
||
|John McKinnon
|-
| rowspan="2"|Richmond
||
|Abraham LeBlanc86528.47%	
|
|David A. Hearn66922.02%	
|
|
||
|David A. Hearn
|-
||
|Joseph Matheson85928.28%	
|
|Roderick Ferguson64521.23%	
|
|
||
|Joseph Matheson
|-
| rowspan="3"|Victoria
|
|N. E. Mckay63019.28%	
|rowspan=2 |
|rowspan=2|John Lemuel Bethune84625.89%	
|rowspan=2|
|rowspan=2|
|rowspan=2 |
|rowspan=2|John Lemuel Bethune
|-	
|
|John J. McCabe862.63%
|-
||
|John A. Fraser97129.71%
|
|Murdoch G. McLeod73522.49%	
|
|
||
|John A. Fraser
|-
|}

References

1890
1890 elections in Canada
1890 in Nova Scotia
May 1890 events